Cheryomushki is a rural locality (a village) in Nizhne-Vazhskoye Rural Settlement, Verkhovazhsky District, Vologda Oblast, Russia. The population was 48 as of 2002. The village was founded in 2000.

Geography 
Cheryomushki is located 2 km southwest of Verkhovazhye (the district's administrative centre) by road. Somitsyno is the nearest rural locality.

References 

Rural localities in Verkhovazhsky District